Terminal Island, released theatrically in the U.K. as Knuckle Men, is a 1973 American action–drama thriller film directed by Stephanie Rothman. It features early screen performances by Tom Selleck and Roger E. Mosley. Although an exploitation film, it has been treated with much serious discussion by critics and academics over the years. It is regarded as a cult film.

Plot
A TV news program does a segment on Terminal Island, an off-shore island established after the abolition of the death penalty. First degree murderers are shipped off to the island to spend the rest of their days fending for themselves.

Carmen is dropped off at Terminal Island. The first prisoner she meets is a former doctor. She comes to realize that there are two main factions on the island. A civil war breaks out.

Cast
Phyllis Davis as Joy 
 as Carmen 
Don Marshall as A.J. 
Marta Kristen as Lee Phillips 
Barbara Leigh as Bunny 
Randy Boone as Easy 
Sean Kenney as Bobby 
Tom Selleck as Dr. Milford 
Roger E. Mosley as Monk 
Geoffrey Deuel as Chino

Release
Rothman later said that she was asked to have a rape scene in the film but could not bring herself to shoot it. "I would not want to be responsible in any way for showing how it could be done", she said.
 
She elaborated:

in a film like Terminal Island [1973], practically the whole film involves violence because the subject matter is violent people. I accepted that. I recognized that if I was going to make films, and I was going to make them for the market, I was making them for it. I wanted to make films very much and that's what I needed to do. What I needed to do was try to refine that and give it some meaning beyond the violence itself, or beyond the nudity itself. In that sense, I tried very hard to not make it exploitative.

The film was originally more violent, but scenes had to be cut out. Rothman was uncomfortable with the violence that she did show. "I was unhappy with the movie and still continue to feel so", she said in 1981.

Film critic Roger Ebert rated Terminal Island one star out of four, dismissing it as "the kind of movie that can almost be reviewed by watching the trailer."

See also
 List of American films of 1973
 No Escape

References

External links

DVD Drive In.com: Review of Terminal Island film

1973 films
American exploitation films
American action thriller films
1970s action thriller films
Films set on islands
Dimension Pictures films
21st Century Film Corporation films
1970s English-language films
1970s American films